The 2019 Oregon State Beavers baseball team began the season as the defending national champion and represented Oregon State University in the 2019 NCAA Division I baseball season. Despite a successful season that saw them ranked as high as No. 1 and selected to host the first round of the 2019 NCAA Division I baseball tournament, the Beavers were eliminated from the first round of the Corvallis Regional.

For the first time in 24 seasons, the team was led by someone other than head coach Pat Casey, who retired from Oregon State following their third national championship under his stewardship. Associate head coach Pat Bailey was given the title of interim head coach, leading to speculation that Pat Casey could return. On June 4, 2019, Oregon State Athletic Director Scott Barnes released a statement that Casey would not exercise his option to return as head coach but would remain in his current position as senior associate athletic director and be a consultant during the search for a new head coach. On June 13, 2019, Mitch Canham, former All-American and player on the 2006 and 2007 national championship teams, was hired as head coach.

Roster

 
 = Injured
 = Redshirt

Schedule and results

Corvallis Regional

Rankings

Awards

Major League Baseball Draft
Adley Rutschman became the first player in Oregon State history to be the #1 Major League Baseball pick when the Baltimore Orioles selected him first overall in the 2019 MLB draft . The previous highest pick was Nick Madrigal, who was selected 4th overall by the Chicago White Sox in the 2018 MLB draft.

References

Oregon State Beavers baseball seasons
Oregon State
2019 in sports in Oregon
Oregon State